Esther Omolayo Kolawole (born 4 January 2002) is a Nigerian wrestler. She represents Nigeria at international competitions. In August 2022, she won bronze in the women's 62 kg event at the 2022 Commonwealth Games held in Birmingham, England.

Career 
Kolawale won the gold medal at the 2018 African Youth Games. In December 2018, she became a national wrestling champion, winning the gold medal for the 55 kg freestyle at the Nigerian National Sports Festival.

In February 2018, she won gold for the 61 kg cadet event during the 2018 African Wrestling Championships.

She won the gold medal in her event at the 2020 African Wrestling Championships held in Algiers, Algeria. In May 2021, she failed to qualify for the 2020 Summer Olympics at the World Olympic Qualification Tournament held in Sofia, Bulgaria. In October 2021, she competed in the women's 55 kg event at the World Wrestling Championships held in Oslo, Norway where she was eliminated in her second match.

In November 2021, she placed third  and won one of the bronze medal in the women's 57 kg freestyle at the 2021 U23 World Wrestling Championships held in Belgrade, Serbia.

In 2022, she lost her bronze medal match in the women's 57 kg event at the Yasar Dogu Tournament held in Istanbul, Turkey. She won bronze in the women's 62 kg event at the 2022 Commonwealth Games held in Birmingham, England. She won the silver medal in the women's 57kg event at the 2021 Islamic Solidarity Games held in Konya, Turkey. She competed in the women's 57kg event at the 2022 World Wrestling Championships held in Belgrade, Serbia.

She won one of the bronze medals in the women's 62kg event at the Grand Prix de France Henri Deglane 2023 held in Nice, France.

Achievements

References

External links 

 
 Esther Omolayo Kolawole at United World Wrestling

Living people
2002 births
Nigerian female sport wrestlers
Wrestlers at the 2022 Commonwealth Games
Commonwealth Games bronze medallists for Nigeria
Commonwealth Games medallists in wrestling
African Wrestling Championships medalists
Islamic Solidarity Games medalists in wrestling
Islamic Solidarity Games competitors for Nigeria
21st-century Nigerian women
Medallists at the 2022 Commonwealth Games